Kharkivski Sokoly (English: Kharkiv Falcons) is a Ukrainian basketball club based in Kharkiv. Founded in 2017, the team made its debut in the Ukrainian Basketball Superleague in 2019.

History
Founded in 2017, Sokoly entered the Ukrainian Higher League, the country's second-tier league. In its first two seasons, the team finished 6th and 9th. After the 2018–19 season, Kharkiv based BC Politekhnik left the SuperLeague as it could not give financial guarantees. Instead, Sokoly received a spot for the 2019–20 campaign.

Season by season

Players

Current roster

Depth chart

Squad changes 2020/2021

In 

|}

Out 

|}

Squad changes 2019/2020

In 

|}

Out 

|}

Notable players
  Igor Boyarkin 1 season: 2019–20
  Delwan Graham 1 season: 2019–20
  Kareem Jamar 1 season: 2019–20

References

Basketball teams in Ukraine
Basketball teams established in 2017
Sport in Kharkiv
2017 establishments in Ukraine